Jason Jermane Sasser (born January 3, 1974) is an American former professional basketball player. He was a 6'7" (201 cm) 225 lb (102 kg) small forward who graduated Justin F. Kimball High School in Dallas, Texas, and played collegiately for the Texas Tech Red Raiders. He played in the NBA from 1997 to 1999.

He played for the US national team in the 1998 FIBA World Championship, winning the bronze medal.

Sasser was selected with the 12th pick of the second round in the 1996 NBA Draft by the Sacramento Kings. He played for three different teams in parts of two NBA seasons, and played in the CBA for the Gary Steelheads and Yakama Sun Kings and overseas in Spain, Germany, Portugal, Kuwait, the Philippines, and South Korea.

His younger brother, Jeryl, also played in the NBA.

References

External links
NBA.com player profile: Jason Sasser

1974 births
Living people
1998 FIBA World Championship players
African-American basketball players
All-American college men's basketball players
American expatriate basketball people in Canada
American expatriate basketball people in Germany
American expatriate basketball people in Portugal
American expatriate basketball people in Spain
American expatriate basketball people in the Philippines
American expatriate basketball people in Kuwait
American men's basketball players
Basketball players from Texas
Brose Bamberg players
CBA All-Star Game players
CB Girona players
Dallas Mavericks players
Liga ACB players
New Mexico Slam players
Philippine Basketball Association imports
Pop Cola Panthers players
Sacramento Kings draft picks
San Antonio Spurs players
Sioux Falls Skyforce (CBA) players
Small forwards
Sportspeople from Denton, Texas
Texas Tech Red Raiders basketball players
United States men's national basketball team players
Vancouver Grizzlies players
Yakama Sun Kings players
21st-century African-American sportspeople
20th-century African-American sportspeople